Following the 2017 Halsnæs municipal election, Steffen Jensen from the Social Democrats had won the mayor's position from Venstre.

In this election, the Social Democrats would win their first absolute majority since the 2007 municipal reform, and for this reason, it was clear that Steffen Jensen would win a second term.

Despite having the absolute majority, the Social Democrats managed to make a constitution that all the 21 seats in municipal council could agree on.

Electoral system
For elections to Danish municipalities, a number varying from 9 to 31 are chosen to be elected to the municipal council. The seats are then allocated using the D'Hondt method and a closed list proportional representation.
Halsnæs Municipality had 21 seats in 2021

Unlike in Danish General Elections, in elections to municipal councils, electoral alliances are allowed.

Electoral alliances  

Electoral Alliance 1

Electoral Alliance 2

Results

Notes

References 

Halsnæs